O Mundial is a newspaper in Winnipeg, Manitoba, Canada. It was founded in 1972 and published until 1976. In 1991, it resumed publication as a monthly. The primary readership for O Mundial is the Portuguese community of Winnipeg.

In 2011, the newspaper was made available on-line.

See also
List of newspapers in Canada

References

External links
 Official website

1972 establishments in Manitoba
1976 disestablishments in Manitoba
1991 establishments in Manitoba
Monthly newspapers
Multicultural and ethnic newspapers published in Canada
Newspapers published in Winnipeg
Portuguese-Canadian culture
Portuguese-language newspapers
Newspapers established in 1972
Publications disestablished in 1976
Publications established in 1991
Defunct newspapers published in Manitoba